National Route 464 is a national highway of Japan connecting Matsudo and Narita, Chiba in Japan, with a total length of 46.9 km (29.14 mi).

References

National highways in Japan
Roads in Chiba Prefecture